Alicia Homs Ginel (born 15 October 1993) is a Spanish politician who was elected as a Member of the European Parliament in 2019.

Education and early career
Born on 15 October 1993 in Palma de Mallorca, she obtained a degree in Political Science and Public Management at the Autonomous University of Barcelona.

Homs subsequently worked as technical advisor to the Regional Ministry of Labor of the Balearic Islands.

Political career
Homs, who ran 17th in the Spanish Socialist Workers' Party list for the 2019 European Parliament election in Spain, was elected MEP. In parliament, she serves on the Committee on Employment and Social Affairs.

In addition to her committee assignments, Homs is part of the European Parliament Intergroup on Disability, the European Parliament Intergroup on Seas, Rivers, Islands and Coastal Areas and the Spinelli Group.

References

1993 births
Living people
MEPs for Spain 2019–2024
21st-century women MEPs for Spain
Spanish Socialist Workers' Party MEPs